Charles Paulet  may refer to:

Charles Paulet, 1st Duke of Bolton (1630–1699), British peer
Charles Paulet, 2nd Duke of Bolton (1661–1722), British peer
Charles Powlett, 3rd Duke of Bolton (1685–1754), British peer
Charles Powlett, 5th Duke of Bolton (1718–1765), British peer
Charles Paulet, 13th Marquess of Winchester (1764–1843), British peer
Charles Powlett, 2nd Baron Bayning (1785–1823), British peer and Tory Member of Parliament
Charles Armand Powlett (c. 1694-1751), British soldier
Charles Powlett  (1728–1809), priest and patron of English cricket

See also
Paulet (surname)